Bernard Burnice Price (September 20, 1915 – January 24, 2002) was an American professional basketball player. He played for the Harlem Globetrotters for many years. He also played for the Chicago Studebaker Flyers in the National Basketball League (NBL) during the 1942–43 season and averaged 9.0 points per game.

His younger brother, Al Price, also played for the Globetrotters and in the NBL.

References

1915 births
2002 deaths
American men's basketball players
Basketball players from Ohio
Centers (basketball)
Chicago Studebaker Flyers players
Forwards (basketball)
Harlem Globetrotters players
Basketball players from Chicago
Sportspeople from Toledo, Ohio